Adam Kighoma Ali Malima (born 26 June 1966)  is a Tanzanian CCM politician and former Member of Parliament for  Mkuranga constituency from 2010 to 2015. He was also the Deputy Minister of Finance and Economic Affairs.

References

1966 births
Living people
Chama Cha Mapinduzi MPs
Tanzanian MPs 2005–2010
Tanzanian MPs 2010–2015
Deputy government ministers of Tanzania
Shaaban Robert Secondary School alumni
Alumni of SOAS University of London